Sheikhupura–Sharaqpur Road (Punjabi), also known locally as Sharaqpur Road is a provincially maintained road in Punjab that extends from Sheikhupura to Sharaqpur, Sheikhupura District.

Features
Length - 31 km
Lanes - 2 lanes
Project starting June 2021
Speed limit - Universal minimum speed limit of 80 km/h and a maximum speed limit of 100 km/h for heavy transport vehicles and 120 km/h for light transport vehicles

References

Roads in Punjab, Pakistan
Sheikhupura District